Pegias is a monotypic genus of freshwater mussels in the family Unionidae. This genus contains the single species Pegias fabula, known commonly as the littlewing pearlymussel.

Distribution
The species is native to the Cumberland and Tennessee River systems in the United States, where it is present in streams in North Carolina, Kentucky, Virginia, and Tennessee. It is a federally listed endangered species of the United States.

Description
This mussel is up to 3.8 centimeters long by 1.3 wide. The outer surface of the shell is light greenish or dark yellowish, but it is often eroded off, leaving the shell chalky whitish in color.

Threat of extinction
This mussel has been extirpated from most streams where it once occurred, including any in the state of Alabama. There are fewer than 12 remaining populations, most of which contain fewer than 500 individuals.

The main threat to the species is bad water quality, especially due to acidic mine drainage. Other threats include oil and gas exploration, road construction, channeling of the rivers, logging, agriculture, and pesticides.

References

Unionidae
Bivalve genera
Monotypic mollusc genera
ESA endangered species
Taxonomy articles created by Polbot